Muditha Maduwantha (born 2 December 1979) is a Sri Lankan former cricketer. He played in 76 first-class and 52 List A matches between 2000/01 and 2007/08. He made his Twenty20 debut on 17 August 2004, for Kurunegala Youth Cricket Club in the 2004 SLC Twenty20 Tournament. Following his playing career, he became a coach in Adelaide, Australia.

References

External links
 

1979 births
Living people
Sri Lankan cricketers
Kurunegala Youth Cricket Club cricketers
Tamil Union Cricket and Athletic Club cricketers
Place of birth missing (living people)